Miguel Ángel Espínola Jiménez (born 5 April 1974) is a Spanish retired professional footballer who played as a right back.

Club career
Born in Guadix, Province of Granada, Espínola played mostly in his native Andalusia. In his first decade as a senior he represented Guadix CF, Motril CF, Manchego CF, UD Almería, Real Balompédica Linense, Recreativo de Huelva and Algeciras CF.

With Recre, Espínola competed in La Liga in 2002–03, starting in 28 of his 31 appearances as the season ended in relegation for the oldest club in Spain. On 15 December 2002, he scored his only goal to put the visitors ahead 2–0 at Real Madrid, but his team eventually finished with ten men and lost 4–2, with him being placed as a goalkeeper following José Antonio Luque's dismissal and not being able to stop the subsequent penalty by Luís Figo.

In 2004–05, Espínola played in Scotland for Clyde. He returned to his homeland in the summer of 2005, for one final campaign with Granada CF in Tercera División.

References

External links

1974 births
Living people
Spanish footballers
Footballers from Andalusia
Association football defenders
La Liga players
Segunda División players
Segunda División B players
Tercera División players
Motril CF players
UD Almería players
Real Balompédica Linense footballers
Recreativo de Huelva players
Algeciras CF footballers
Granada CF footballers
Scottish Football League players
Clyde F.C. players
Spanish expatriate footballers
Expatriate footballers in Scotland
Spanish expatriate sportspeople in Scotland
Sportspeople from the Province of Granada
People from Guadix